Bertram Watkins (25 June 1902 – 22 December 1982) was an English cricketer. He played for Gloucestershire between 1932 and 1938.

References

External links

1902 births
1982 deaths
English cricketers
Gloucestershire cricketers
Cricketers from Gloucester
People from Badminton, Gloucestershire